Huazhong University of Science and Technology Station, is a station on Line 2 of Wuhan Metro. It entered revenue service on February 19, 2019. It is located in Hongshan District and it serves the Huazhong University of Science and Technology.

Station layout

References

Wuhan Metro stations
Line 2, Wuhan Metro
Railway stations in China opened in 2019